Callulops is a genus of microhylid frogs from Sulawesi as well as the New Guinea region, from Talaud Islands and the Maluku Islands (Moluccas) in the northwest to the Louisiade Archipelago in the east.
They are medium- to large-sized terrestrial frogs inhabiting burrows on the forest floor, often under large rocks. Because their population densities can be low, and they are difficult to observe and collect owing to their lifestyle, many species are known only from few specimens.

Species

References

 
Microhylidae
Amphibians of Asia
Amphibians of Oceania
Amphibian genera
Taxa named by George Albert Boulenger